is a Japanese politician from the Constitutional Democratic Party of Japan, and formerly other incarnations of Japanese center-left and social democratic parties. She is a member of the House of Representatives from the 10th District of Osaka. Tsujimoto is also the current policy chief of the CDP.

Early career 
Kiyomi Tsujimoto was born in Ōyodo-chō, Yoshino-gun, Nara Prefecture. She was raised in Takatsuki, Osaka Prefecture. After graduation from senior high school, she worked as an employee at a department store for two years. She graduated with a B.Ed degree from Waseda University in 1987.

While still an undergraduate in 1983, Tsujimoto founded the Peace Boat with fellow university students and pacifist activists, such as Makoto Oda, the Representative of Beheiren ("Betonamu ni Heiwa o Shimin Rengo" — Citizen's League for Peace in Vietnam). Peace Boat is a grass-roots international friendship organization that 'works to promote peace, human rights, equal and sustainable development and respect for the environment' by organizing educational global voyage. With its growing international recognition and support, it attained Special Consultative Status with the Economic and Social Council of the United Nations. As a Japan-based group it criticizes the Japanese government's silence on its aggressive past; the Peace Boat's first voyage was to countries that had been invaded by Japan in World War II and it has consistently worked for reconciliation between Japan and these countries. Its passengers also met Yasser Arafat several times; because of its support for the Palestinian causes, Israel refused the Peace Boat entry into the country in 2002. Tsujimoto also worked in Osaka as a non-profit organization coordinator, and attended the Earth Summit held in Rio de Janeiro in 1992 representing an NGO.

Political career 
In 1994, the Japan Socialist Party (JSP) came to power under Tomiichi Murayama, in a coalition with the Liberal Democratic Party (LDP) and the New Party Sakigake.  However the LDP returned to power in 1996 and the JSP collapsed, with most of its members eventually leaving to join the Democratic Party of Japan. Chairwoman Doi reformed the JSP into the Social Democratic Party (SDP); she personally asked Tsujimoto to run in Osaka, as a part of her reform of the SDP to increase representation of women and put stronger emphasis on grass-roots activism, and she was elected to the House of Representatives. As an opposition MP, she rose to fame as a vocal critic of the conservative, ruling Liberal Democratic Party and played an integral role in enacting legislations concerning domestic violence, gender equality, child pornography and activities of non-profit organizations. With growing popularity as a young, charismatic politician, she was chosen as one of the Young Global Leaders by the World Economic Forum in 2000.

Tsujimoto has also argued for dialogue rather than confrontation with North Korea, proposing that the North Korean abductions of Japanese citizens can best be solved by "embedding North Korea as a member of international society".

Scandal, resignation, and comeback 
Kiyomi Tsujimoto was one of the chief antagonists of the beleaguered Muneo Suzuki during the scandals that emerged in 2002. Suzuki was ultimately jailed for fraud.

But, as a result of internal tensions between newcomers and veterans in the SDP, a staff member of the Democratic Party of Japan who had formerly worked for the SDP accused Tsujimoto of using her secretary's government salary to cover campaign expenses. Tsujimoto admitted unauthorised use of funds, resigned her seat in the Diet, and was given a suspended sentence.

Her political career was not over.  She ran unsuccessfully for a seat in the House of Councillors in the 11 July 2004 elections, but won a proportional representation seat for the House of Representatives in the 11 September 2005 elections that also returned Prime Minister Junichirō Koizumi to power.

Suzuki's political fate has run parallel to Tsujimoto's.  He also ran unsuccessfully in 2004 for a seat in the House of Councillors but was subsequently elected to the House of Representatives in 2005.

See also 
 Peace Boat

References

External links 
 Peace Boat Web site
 "Tsujimoto throws her hat into ring", 17 August 2005, The Japan Times
 "Tsujimoto bares teeth, licks wounds" 28 March 2002, Mainichi Daily News
 What's all this, eh? by Eric Johnston, the Foreign Correspondents' Club of Japan
 Kiyomi Tsujimoto, part II by Eric Johnston, the Foreign Correspondents' Club of Japan

|-

1960 births
Living people
Female members of the House of Representatives (Japan)
Members of the House of Representatives (Japan)
Japanese activists
Japanese women activists
Japanese feminists
Japanese fraudsters
Japanese politicians convicted of crimes
Politicians from Nara Prefecture
Constitutional Democratic Party of Japan politicians
Democratic Party of Japan politicians
Social Democratic Party (Japan) politicians
Waseda University alumni
21st-century Japanese politicians
21st-century Japanese women politicians